The Three Fingers is a mountain which is located in Snohomish County, Washington. The Three Fingers is a prominent and recognizable landmark in northern Snohomish County.

The first ascent of the mountain came in 1929, by Darrington-based mountaineers Harry Bedal and Harold Engles. A fire lookout was built on the southernmost peak by Bedal, Engels, and Frank Benesh, and was seasonally staffed from 1933 until 1942. Supposedly, the top  of the southern peak was blasted for the cabin, lowering the mountain's height in the process. It was abandoned and later rebuilt by local mountaineering groups in the 1960s and 1980s. The lookout was added to the National Register of Historic Places in 1987, alongside other structures in the Mount Baker-Snoqualmie National Forest.

The mountain is used for recreational climbing, with a  round-trip trail originating on the east side at a trailhead on the Mountain Loop Highway.

See also
Queest-alb Glacier

References

Further reading

External links

Mountains of Washington (state)
Cascade Range
Mountains of Snohomish County, Washington